Anvar Karimovich Bikzhanov (born 21 April 1950) is a Russian football coach.

Bikzhanov has managed FC Lada-Togliatti-VAZ Togliatti and FC Chernomorets Novorossiysk in the Russian First Division.

External links
 Profile by footballfacts.ru

1951 births
Living people
Soviet football managers
Russian football managers
FC Lada-Tolyatti managers
FC Chernomorets Novorossiysk managers
Place of birth missing (living people)